Kelloside is a historic place south of Kirkconnel parish and the River Nith in Dumfries and Galloway, Dumfriesshire, Scotland. Old Kelloside is located along the Kello Water, which joins the Nith a mile (1.5 km) to the east.

It was designated a Historic Environment Scotland property in 1986. It is a large two-story farmhouse built in 1870 or 1876, likely incorporating an earlier house. It is a L-shaped building.

It was the birthplace of Archibald McCall (1734–1814), whose family had lived on the land for generations. His father, Samuel McCall, was a merchant who operated between Glasgow and Colonial Virginia.

It is described as:

References

External links
 

Dumfries and Galloway